Astathes flaviventris is a species of beetle in the family Cerambycidae. It was described by Pascoe in 1867. It is known from Borneo.

Varietas
 Astathes flaviventris var. apicerufa Breuning, 1956
 Astathes flaviventris var. borneensis Aurivillius, 1911
 Astathes flaviventris var. medioviolacea Breuning, 1950
 Astathes flaviventris var. violaceoreducta Breuning, 1956

References

F
Beetles described in 1867